Bichvinta-Miuseri Strict Nature Reserve is a protected area in the Gagra District and Gudauta District of Abkhazia, Georgia.
Reserve main goal  is protecting Bichvinta's relic and colonized flora and fauna.

Geography 
Bichvinta-Miuseri Strict Nature Reserve  is located on the Black Sea coast of Abkhazia and has three sections: Myussera (215 hectares),  Lidzava  (165 hectares) and Pitsunda (1296 hectares).

Flora 
Bichvinta-Miuseri Strict Nature Reserve famous for groves of Pitsundian pine (Pinus brutia var. pityusa). There are also Buxus colchica,  Caucasian walnut (Pterocarya fraxinifolia), yew (Taxus baccata), Colchic figs (Ficus colchica), and Diospyros lotus which are typical for landscapes around the Mediterranean Sea.

See also 
Pitsunda

References 

National parks of Georgia (country)
Protected areas established in 1965
Geography of Abkhazia
Territorial disputes of Georgia (country)